Robert Moss Ayres (August 19, 1898 – August 7, 1977) was an American architect who lived and worked in Texas. He was the son and business partner of Atlee Ayres.

Early life and education
Ayres was born in San Antonio to Atlee B. Ayres and Olive Moss Ayres. His parents sent him to the private military preparatory San Antonio Academy, and later to the college preparatory Haverford School. Upon graduation from Haverford, he studied architecture with Paul Philippe Cret at the University of Pennsylvania.

Career
Ayres spent a year with an architectural firm in New York City before returning to San Antonio. In 1921, his father announced he had joined his firm, partnering as Atlee B. and Robert M. Ayres, Architects.

He worked on a number of projects with his father, including the following:
 200 block of Mary Louise in Monticello Park, San Antonio
 McNay Art Museum   
 Menger Hotel modernization and addition of a new wing 
 Smith-Young Tower (1929)
 Administration Building (Randolph Air Force Base), known as the "Taj Mahal" (1931)
 Nave Museum (Royston Nave Memorial)1932, Victoria, Texas
 Old Cameron County Jail
 San Antonio Municipal Auditorium, for which he and the firm received a gold medal from the AIA in 1929 for the design
 Lutcher Brown House, a house in San Antonio.

He was president of the San Antonio chapter of the American Institute of Architects.

Personal life

On December 2, 1925, he married San Antonio socialite and community organizer Florence Collett.The couple had four children. He died on August 7, 1977 and was buried in Mission Burial Park North in San Antonio. Florence died in 1992 and is buried next to him.

Gallery

References

Further reading

External links
 
 Texas Courthouses on Texas Escapes.com

20th-century American architects
Architects from San Antonio
San Antonio Academy alumni
1898 births
1977 deaths
Haverford School alumni